Il sindacalista (The Trade Unionist) is a 1972 Italian comedy film directed by Luciano Salce.

Plot 
The Sicilian worker Saverio Ravizzi (Buzzanca), just hired in a factory in Bergamo, begins to mobilize his fellow workers in better working conditions, unaware that his spontaneous activism is actually used as part of a larger financial plan by the owner of the factory.

Cast 

 Lando Buzzanca: Saverio Ravizzi 
 Renzo Montagnani: Luigi Tamperletti 
 Paola Pitagora: Vera 
 Isabella Biagini: Teresa Piredda, wife of Saverio
 Giancarlo Maestri: Tonino Pagliari 
 Dominique Boschero: Marisa 
 Giacomo Rizzo: Stelvio De Paolis 
 Gino Santercole: Labourer 
 Piero Vida: Vezio Bellinelli  
 Gianfranco Barra: Carabiniere

References

External links

Il sindacalista at Variety Distribution

1972 films
Italian comedy films
1972 comedy films
Films directed by Luciano Salce
Films about the labor movement
Films scored by Guido & Maurizio De Angelis
1970s Italian films